Syntrophothermus is a bacterial genus from the family of Syntrophomonadaceae. Up to now there is only on species of this genus known (Syntrophothermus lipocalidus).

References

Further reading 
 

Eubacteriales
Monotypic bacteria genera
Bacteria genera